This is a list of fictional characters from the Japanese science fiction anime television series After War Gundam X.

Freeden pilots and crew

The main character of the series, and a 15-year-old hot-headed boy who is skilled at Mobile Suit operation and espionage. He was originally hired to rescue Tiffa Adill from the Vulture ship Freeden but upon realising his employer only wanted to exploit her later becomes part of its crew. Though considered an Old Type, he is later revealed as a piloting genius by Jamil, as he quickly masters new Gundam upgrades. For much of the series, he nurses a fairly obvious crush on Tiffa but does not act, fearing that the Tiffa would be unnerved by his advances, since she was denied most of her childhood. His love for her is what drives him to pilot the GX-9900 Gundam X, the GX-9900-DV Gundam X Divider, and later the GX-9901-DX Gundam Double X. At the end of the series, he and Tiffa go off together when the crew of the Freeden disband.

A mysterious Newtype girl who demonstrates clairvoyance throughout the series. She is "rescued" by Garrod from the Freeden but later joins the crew together with Garrod. She is very quiet and shy due to the horrible things she has seen, and is a frequent target for kidnapping due to her abilities. Thanks to Garrod and the Freeden crew she begins to open up, and eventually falls in love with Garrod. Although she has paranormal abilities, she has never once considered herself a Newtype.  In Gundam X, she and Garrod have two character songs each.

The captain of the Freeden, a Vulture ship. He was once a Newtype pilot of the old United Nations Earth who piloted a Gundam X in the 7th Space War, and it was also him who fired the fatal shot which changed history. Now he searches the Earth for Newtypes to rescue and protect. It seems that he has had feelings for a fellow Newtype named Lucille Lilliant for many years, and at the end of the series he gets together with his advisor Sala Tyrrell and works as a liaison between the Earth Governments and the Space Colonies.

Jamil Neate and Lancerow Dowell's rivalry mirrors that of the Newtype aces Amuro Ray and Char Aznable. Their final battle in 7th Space War is similar to the final clash of the original Gundam series between the Gundam and the Zeong. However, Gundam X goes to an alternate way at the last, where Lancerow saved Jamil's life and worked as the representative of the SRA in the peace conference after the war.

Techs Farzenbarg

The Freeden physician, versed in a variety of knowledge, from psychology to 20th-century European poetry. His other interests are equally varied, and include coffee and billiards—he is a skilled player, but sometimes sneaks into the rec room for private practice sessions. After the crew parted ways, he continues to practice medicine in field hospitals, skillfully keeping soldiers of both sides from one another's throats.

Roybea Loy

The pilot of the GT-9600 Gundam Leopard and its upgraded form GT-9600-D Gundam Leopard Destroy. At the beginning he was only hired to do one job for the Freeden but later takes a more permanent position as one of her defenders. He's pretty much a ladies man who does, however, care for each lover he has had. On a humorous note, Roybea displays the ability to accurately gauge a woman's clothing sizes just by looking at her. He acquired his Gundam on a bet from a woman he considered his true love. He has a crush on Sala, who firmly rejects his advances. He and Ennil El eventually become a couple and are last seen in Witz's hometown.

Toniya Malme

She is the bridge operator in charge of communications. In contrast to her crewmate Sala, she is a free-spirited woman who is fashion-conscious and sensitive. She quickly becomes friends with Ennil El at Saint's Island, and although she invites her to join the Freeden, it would take some time for Ennil to join forces. Before the final battle near the lunar base, Witz proposed to her; at the end of the series she accompanies him to his hometown.

Shingo Mori

The Freeden helmsman, who can also be found working in supply procurement, salvaging, guard duty, and trade negotiations. It is said that he is able to pilot even a spacecraft simply by reading the manual.

Kid Salsamille

The Freeden chief mechanic, and a (self-styled) technical genius at the age of 12. He strives for high quality and professionalism in his work, and will push himself to work beyond exhaustion. He also has an impulsive side; specifically, he can hardly resist tinkering with Mobile Suits and other large mechs. His grand ideas, however, led to the powerful upgrades for the Freeden Gundam complement. At the series' close, he, along with Shingo, Paula, and his two subordinates Lokoko and Nine open a repair shop and salvage yard called "Freeden III".

Witz Sou

The pilot of the GW-9800 Gundam Airmaster and its upgraded form GW-9800-B Gundam Airmaster Burst. Like Roybea, he initially had a one-time contract with the Freeden but finally also joins the crew. Later in the series it is revealed that he uses the money gained from his work as a mercenary to support his family. He returns home at the end of the series with his new fiancée Toniya, Roybea and Ennil.

Sala Tyrrell

She is the bridge operator in charge of the sensors and hangar, and second-in-command to Jamil. She has a straightforward, by-the-book attitude that projects a rather stern image, particularly when Tiffa was brought aboard, as Jamil often focused his attention on the girl. She does, however, grow to become fond of Tiffa when she sees her abilities help protect the Freeden from danger.

New United Nations Earth
Shagia Frost

The elder of the twin Frost brothers, working for the New United Nations Earth as a spy. He pilots the NRX-0013 Gundam Virsago and its upgraded form NRX-0013-CB Gundam Virsago Chest Break. He has been under the care of the UNE Newtype Laboratory from his youth, and while he trained with recognized Newtypes, his telepathic ability was not compatible with the Flash System, and so the lab designated him as "Category F" along with his brother Olba. As a result, he made it his personal mission to eliminate any Newtype candidate that the UNE government ordered him to find, in revenge against the people who would not recognize his power. Cold and ruthless, he is also deeply committed to his cause, and will stop at nothing for its success. He and his brother seemingly perish at end of the series in their final confrontation with Garrod Ran, but are seen briefly at the end; Shagia is seen in a wheelchair.

He appears as the pilot of the Virsago in arcade game Mobile Suit Gundam: Gundam vs. Gundam.

Olba Frost

The younger of the twin Frost brothers, also working for the New United Nations Earth. He pilots the NRX-0015 Gundam Ashtaron and its upgraded form NRX-0015-HC Gundam Ashtaron Hermit Crab. Although he tries to assume the same attitude of his brother, he is at times a bloodthirsty Mobile Suit rider, obsessed with his sense of superiority. He only respects his beloved brother Shagia, and will usually obey his orders even if his emotions get the better of him. He and Shagia apparently die after their duel with Garrod, but the last scene shows that they survived, with Shagia in a wheelchair and Olba standing next to him.

Olba makes a brief appearance in arcade game Mobile Suit Gundam: Gundam vs. Gundam as Ashtaron, featured as Virsago's usable weapon (where Ashtaron holds the Gundam X to let Virsago deliver the finishing blow) and Virsago's Mobile Armor mode(Ashtaron carries Virsago to increase travelling speed and length); through never shown, Olba appears in the game when Virsago is the last unit to be destroyed.

Olba Frost's voice actor stated in an interview that after using "Nii-san" (Older brother) so many times during the series, he has developed an aversion to the word.

Fixx Bloodman

The leader of newly-formed New United Nations Earth. Although he says he doesn’t want to repeat the mistakes of the past he is only interested in war. The Frost brothers work for him but in truth he is manipulated by them. He was killed by Frost Brother's Satellite Cannon in the Final Battle.

Aimzat Kartral

The UNE Intelligence Minister who is the Frost brothers' superior at the start of the series. He deeply believes that Newtypes are the way to greater power for humanity, and has tried to further this view among his superiors in the UNE Reconstruction Committee. He involves the design of Gundam Double X but the suit was stolen by Garrod (with the help of Jamil, Tiffa and Kattok). He was finally killed by Frost Brothers as they think Aimzat has no more use for them.

Space Revolutionary Army
Lancerow Dowell

An officer and Mobile Suit ace in the SRA during the 7th Space War, he was the arch-rival of Jamil Neate. After meeting Tiffa, he tried, to no avail, to persuade SRA President Seidel Rasso not to use certain superweapons against the resistance group Satyricon. Zaider's stubbornness, along with the death of his friend Nichola Fafas, caused him to question his involvement in the war. In the end he joins up Jamil's Vultures and becomes part of the peace movement to improve relations between Earth and the Colonies.

Seidel Rasso

The president of the SRA and also the leader of Newtypism, a cult that forwards the view that all space-born people are Newtypes. His target is to conquer Earth and for this he tries to contact D.O.M.E. in the lunar base, because he knows the ultimate secret of Newtypes. He was killed by Frost Brother's Satellite Cannon in the Final Battle.

Nichola Fafas

A SRA officer who kidnaps Tiffa and brings her to the colonies. He is a friend of Lancerow Dowell and like him he begins to question Zaider’s motives. Because of this, he is arrested and executed for sedition.

Other
Paula Cis

Paula is a member of the space colony resistance group "Satyricon", and the pilot of the GS-9900 G-Falcon. She is a loudmouthed, tomboyish orphan, and one of the first children born after the colony drop that ended the 7th Space War. She is the only person her age in Satyricon, and as such, she takes an immediate liking to Garrod when he is brought to the asteroid base. When Garrod accepts the rebels' offer to repair the Double X, she makes him her partner, as the G-Falcon has the ability to dock with most Gundam-type Mobile Suits. At the end of the series, she and the rest of the Freeden engineering crew open up a repair shop.

Carris Nautilus

An artificial Newtype whose goal is to bring peace to a united world. For this goal he assists Nomoa Long in his attempt to use the mobile armor Patulia. Because he is an artificial Newtype, he regularly suffers from the condition called the "Synapse Syndrome", where he experiences pain akin to a terrible death. Initially he defeated Garrod with the RMSN-008 Bertigo, severely damaging the Gundam X, but later falling to the upgraded Divider and a recovered Garrod. After the New United Nations Earth is established, he joins an anti-UNE militia in the North American continent, later intercepting a convoy carrying the Freeden Gundams and rescuing the Vulture crew. He later takes part in the final battle and becomes a peace ambassador for his country.

Ennil El

The daughter of deceased SRA Major General Nada El. She and her father were stranded on Earth at the end of the war and after he died, she developed a hatred of those living on the planet. She became a mercenary and had numerous run-ins with the Freeden crew, at one point assisting in the Patulia project. She develops feelings for Garrod, though he never returns them. After the Patulia is destroyed, she wanders into Saint's Island where she opens a restaurant called "Lilac" and attracts the eye of Miles Goodman. But she finds that she could not escape her violent past, and ends up leaving after learning her new friend Toniya is a Freeden crew member. Eventually she joins the Freeden, and at the end of the series she travels to Witz's hometown together with Roybea.

D.O.M.E.

The mysterious entity which exists in the lunar base with the satellite system; his name is an acronym for "Depths Of Mind Elevating". He is the first Newtype and later reveals the truth about himself and Newtypes to the Freeden crew and the leaders of New United Nations Earth and the Space Revolutionary Army. Although he has been dismantled into a genetic level. "He" (with the aid of the system in lunar base) can operate everything, including the G-Bit, on his own.

It was initially planned that the D.O.M.E. would be voiced by Toru Furuya (voice actor of Amuro Ray), but Furuya turned down the offer. He would not involve any Gundam-related cast other than Amuro until Mobile Suit Gundam 00, in which he was cast as character Ribbons Almark and the narrator of the series.

Nomoa Long, AKA Professor Dorat

Mayor of Fort Severn. He was actually a leader of the SRA infiltration plot called "Operation Lilac", in which a team of Newtypes with RMSN-008 Bertigos and the Mobile Armor Patulia assault major UNE targets on the Earth. The plan had failed however, and with only one Bertigo and the Patulia at his disposal, he spent fifteen years perfecting the artificial Newtype technology in the hope of one day exacting his revenge on the Earth.

Fong Alternative

Director of the Alternative laboratory, where Tiffa Adill was found by Jamil Neate. He is exploitative, as demonstrated by his attitude toward Tiffa, and by his willingness to dispose of his mercenaries, the Frost brothers, with the SRA Mobile Armor MA-06 Grandine.

Reich Anto

He is the Alternative laboratory agent who hired Garrod to recover Tiffa from the Freeden.

Vultures
Zakot Datnel

The leader of a Vulture group apparently specializing in incendiary weapons. He was, at one point, partners with Ennil El, and was a reckless scavenger, sending his Mobile Suit riders into defunct UNE power plants despite their tendency to explode.

Gritz Jo

Rosa Intenso

Rosso Amarant

These three Vulture captains are old friends of Jamil's, and were recruited by him to help rescue Tiffa from the Alternative laboratory after she was recaptured by Olba Frost.

Renegade Mobile Suit riders
Krokka

This is the pilot of the Mobile Suit in episode 1 that was thrown to the civilians. His suit was captured by Garrod undamaged, and himself was being thrown into ground, where furious civilian are waiting for him.

Vedoba Morte

In episode 2, she is the first Mobile Suit rider to discover the GX. Her suit was heavily damaged by the Gundam X in combat, and she was killed by other vultures who was hunting for the Gundam X.

Orcs
Doza Baroy

First appearing in episode 16, he is the Orcs' primary producer and distributor of the D-Navi, an underwater navigation system that used the brains of dolphins. He becomes obsessed with capturing the Freeden Gundams after he discovers them rescuing Tiffa during a hunt for dolphins. And his ship was sunk by Gundam Leopard which was modified to use in water.

Marcus Guy

An Orc submarine captain who was hired by Olba Frost to salvage several G-Bits on the ocean floor in the region called the "Sea of Lorelei". He and Olba discover Lucille Rilliant encased in the L System, a device that deactivates electrical systems within a large radius by amplifying a Flash System-compatible Newtype's power. But finally he was killed by First brother to avoid information leakage.

Civilians
Miles Goodman

He is the son of the Saint's Island Immigration Bureau director and one of the immigration officers. He asked Ennil to marry him, but he would never hear her answer, as New United Nations Earth forces executed him along with all government members.

References

After War Gundam X
After War